The Dow Jones Transportation Average (DJTA, also called the "Dow Jones Transports") is a U.S. stock market index from S&P Dow Jones Indices of the transportation sector, and is the most widely recognized gauge of the American transportation sector. It is the oldest stock index still in use, even older than its better-known relative, the Dow Jones Industrial Average (DJIA).

Components

The index is a running average of the stock prices of twenty transportation corporations, with each stock's price weighted to adjust for stock splits and other factors. As a result, it can change at any time the markets are open. The figure mentioned in news reports is usually the figure derived from the prices at the close of the market for the day.

Changes in the index's composition are rare, and generally occur only after corporate acquisitions or other dramatic shifts in a component's core business. Should such an event require that one component be replaced, the entire index is reviewed. , the index consists of the following 20 companies: 

Alaska Air Group replaced AMR Corporation on December 2, 2011, after AMR corp. filed for bankruptcy protection. 

Effective October 30, 2012, Kirby Corp. replaced Overseas Shipholding Group, Inc.

Effective October 1, 2014, Avis Budget Group Inc. replaced GATX Corporation.

On October 15, 2015, American Airlines Group replaced Con-way.

Effective December 14, 2021, Old Dominion Freight Line replaced Kansas City Southern.

History

The average was created on July 3, 1884, by Charles Dow, co-founder of Dow Jones & Company, as part of the "Customer's Afternoon Letter". At its inception, it consisted of eleven transportation companies—nine railroads and two non-rail companies:
Chicago, Milwaukee and St. Paul Railway
Chicago and North Western Railway
Delaware, Lackawanna and Western Railroad
Lake Shore and Michigan Southern Railway
Louisville and Nashville Railroad
Missouri Pacific Railway
New York Central Railroad
Northern Pacific Railroad preferred stock
Pacific Mail Steamship Company (not a railroad)
Union Pacific Railway
Western Union (not a railroad)

As a result of the dominating presence of railroads, the Transportation Average was often referred to as "rails" in financial discussions in the early and middle part of the 20th century.

Use in Dow theory

The Transportation Average is an important factor in Dow theory.

Price history

In 1964, the index first broke 200, slightly over where it was in 1929.

In 1983, the index first broke 500. In 1987, the index broke 1000. It closed at 2146.89 on March 9, 2009, having a low coincident with some other indices; this was a bit above its low of 1942.19 on March 11, 2003.

The index broke above the mid-5000s to begin a run of record highs on January 15, 2013, at a time when the better-known Industrials stood about 5% below all-time highs achieved more than five years earlier. By May, the Industrials and all other major indexes except the NASDAQ group were making all-time highs, including the Transports, which reached new closing and intraday records above the 6,500 level. On October 24, 2013, the Transports closed at 7,022.79, for its first close above 7,000 points. It closed the year at a record high of 7,400.57. On May 27, 2014, it first closed above 8,000 points. The index closed above 9000 on November 10, 2014. At the close of 2014, the index hit 9139.92. At the close of 2015, the index hit 7508.71, a loss of 17.85% on the year.

Annual returns 
The following table shows the price return of the Dow Jones Transportation Average, which was calculated back to 1924.

Record values

Investing 
There is no fund that tracks this index. There are funds that have a similar behavior, such as iShares Transportation Average ETF.

See also
 Dow Jones Composite Average
 Dow theory

References

External links
Official Website

Dow Jones & Company website
Yahoo: Chart of DJTA performance (1928-present)
 chart of DJT vs SPX from Yahoo! Finance

 
American stock market indices
Stock market indices by industry
S&P Dow Jones Indices
1884 establishments in the United States